Jin Goo (born July 20, 1980) is a South Korean actor. He won Best Supporting Actor at the Grand Bell Awards and Blue Dragon Film Awards for his role in Bong Joon-ho's 2009 noir thriller Mother. He is also known for his role in the critically and commercially successful series Descendants of the Sun.

Career

2003–2008: Beginnings
Jin Goo made his television debut in the 2003 gambling drama All In, as the younger version of the protagonist character played by Lee Byung-hun. They reunited onscreen in Kim Jee-woon's film noir A Bittersweet Life, and Jin would later join Lee when he established his own management agency, BH Entertainment.

In 2005, Jin starred in the one-episode drama Saya, Saya ("Bird, Bird"), adapted from the novel written by Shin Kyung-sook about a mother and son who are both deaf. It won the top award in the TV movie/miniseries category of Prix Italia, and the jury praised it as "a magical, moving and poetic story about the power of love with high quality performances."

After a guest appearance as a Korean language teacher on the webisodes of Japanese drama Joshi Deka!, Jin returned to Korean television in 2008's Spotlight, a glimpse into the lives of broadcast news reporters covering the city beat. To prepare for his role, Jin followed a cub reporter for a day, and realized they didn't have time to bathe or even wash their faces.

Though he appeared in little-seen mystery romance The ESP Couple, Jin would become known for playing strong moody characters, such as a low-ranking thug in Yoo Ha's A Dirty Carnival, and a serial killer in Truck. For his portrayal of a secretive doctor in arthouse horror film Epitaph, Jin received a Best New Actor trophy from the Golden Cinematography Awards.

2009–2015: Breakthrough and continued acting
Jin's breakthrough would be his critically acclaimed supporting turn in 2009's Mother. His performance in the Bong Joon-ho thriller earned him recognition from the Grand Bell Awards, the University Film Festival of Korea, and the Blue Dragon Film Awards.

In 2010, Jin shed his hardboiled image to play a down-to-earth, aspiring chef in Le Grand Chef 2: Kimchi Battle. He said the film was a great pleasure to make since cooking is a hobby of his, though emulating a professional chef meant undergoing "200 hours of chopping radishes" in order to perfect the motion. He added that after the filming, he was able to make kimchi with his mother, which proved to be a memorable experience.

2011 was a busy year for Jin. Besides appearing in conspiracy thriller Moby Dick, he had a starring role as one of three desperate Joseon soldiers in The Showdown. He also made his stage debut as Nathan in a Korean production of the musical Guys and Dolls.

He next starred in 26 Years, based on Kang Full's manhwa about a plot to assassinate the man responsible for the Gwangju Massacre. Jin had been attached to the project since pre-production began in 2008, but investors backed out due to the politically controversial content. Online donations from thousands of private individuals enabled filming to resume in 2012. Jin was the only holdover from the original cast; initially cast as the young policeman, he now played the more central role of the gangster.

In 2013, he played the titular character in TV series Ad Genius Lee Tae-baek, a success story about a man who comes up to Seoul from the countryside armed with nothing but a high school diploma and a gift for drawing, and through sheer hard work, fights his way to become the best ad man and art director in the business.

Supporting roles followed in thriller The Target, period blockbuster The Admiral: Roaring Currents, and nostalgic musical drama C'est Si Bon. In 2015, Jin starred in Northern Limit Line, a naval thriller about the Second Battle of Yeonpyeong.

2016–present: Rising popularity
2016 was a remarkable year for Jin Goo. He was cast as an elite special forces soldier in Descendants of the Sun, a romantic melodrama written by Kim Eun-sook. The drama was a critical and commercial success in Asia, and led to a surge in popularity for Jin. Later in the year, Jin starred in MBC's melodrama Night Light.
 
In 2017, Jin starred in the action film One Line, where he played a legendary swindler that joins with a student (Im Si-wan) to rob a bank. He then starred in JTBC's action melodrama Untouchable.

In 2019, Jin starred in the legal drama Legal High, a remake of the Japanese television series of the same name.

In December 2020, Jin signed with new agency Varo Entertainment.

Personal life
Jin married his girlfriend on September 21, 2014. The couple welcomed a baby boy in June 2015. They welcomed their second child, a baby girl, in November 2016.

Jin completed his mandatory military service in the Republic of Korea Navy military police.

Filmography

Film

Television series

Web series

Music video

Musical theatre

Awards and nominations

References

External links

 
 
 
 
 
 

South Korean male film actors
South Korean male television actors
South Korean male musical theatre actors
Male actors from Seoul
21st-century South Korean male actors
1980 births
Living people